Margarita (minor planet designation: 310 Margarita) is a typical Main belt asteroid. It was discovered by Auguste Charlois on 16 May 1891 in Nice.

References

External links 
 
 

000310
Discoveries by Auguste Charlois
Named minor planets
000310
18910516